Anglia Components plc is the UK's largest privately owned independent authorised distributor of electronic components trading under the name Anglia. Technically adept, with an experienced team of staff, Anglia supports OEM and EMS companies in every sector of electronics manufacturing. Anglia's suppliers include some of the world's leading electronic component brands, complemented by many smaller companies with leadership in their chosen technologies. A signatory of the ADS SC21 programme, Anglia holds AS9120, ISO9001 & ISO14001 accreditations.

History
Anglia was founded in 1972 by Bill Ingram, who started the business from home as a sole trader. The initial operation was established to provide spare parts to the Radio and TV repair trade. As Anglia developed it moved to premises in Burdett Road, Wisbech, Cambridgeshire, UK. By 1980 Anglia had grown significantly and directed its efforts towards the electronics manufacturing industry.

The signing of distribution agreements and the launch of direct product brands throughout the 1980s resulted in Anglia holding much more extensive inventory, they moved to a distribution centre and offices in Sandall Road, Wisbech, Cambridgeshire, UK during 1992, where Anglia remains today.

The late 1990s and early 2000s saw considerable expansion at Anglia, of its supplier line card and product portfolio. During this period, Anglia created specialist divisions to develop emerging technologies and set up a logistics and distribution operation in Hong Kong.

In 2011 Steve Rawlins (CEO) reached agreement with the majority shareholder Bill Ingram to purchase the remainder of Anglia's shares thereby securing Anglia's position as the UK's largest privately owned distributor. The transfer of ownership was completed in 2019 without the use of any external funding.

At the beginning of 2013 the company launched Anglia-Live, its e-commerce website, offering a comprehensive parametric search engine, live inventory, live pricing and online ordering. In more recent times, Anglia has signed numerous distribution agreements with major semiconductor suppliers significantly enhancing its product profile whilst continuing to receive multiple awards from its principle suppliers.

On Sunday 26 April 2020 Anglia ranked for the first time on the 21st annual Sunday Times Profit Track  based on its financial performance over the last three years.

In 2021 Anglia launched a dedicated division called Anglia Unicorn. Targeting the UK's vibrant start-up community and the entrepreneurs who support them, this carefully curated service gives start-ups free access to product samples, development boards and skilled engineers to make their vision a reality. As the project progresses past prototype stage it continues to provide logistics support and access to a network of trusted manufacturing companies who can help take the product through to mass production.

References

External links
Official Website
Anglia Live Website

Electronic component distributors